This event was held on Sunday 29 January 2012 as part of the UCI Cyclo-cross World Championships in Koksijde, Belgium. Five laps had to be completed, totalling up to 14.79 kilometre. It was won by Marianne Vos of Netherlands who was first and in control from start to finish. In the background Sanne Cant of Belgium, quite adapt in the sand, tried to get rid of Daphny Van Den Brand of Netherlands in the many sand patches, but never managed to. Van Den Brand eventually beat Cant in the sprint, taking home the silver.

Ranking

References

External links
 

Women's elite race
UCI Cyclo-cross World Championships – Women's elite race